is a railway station on the Obama Line in the city of Obama, Fukui Prefecture, Japan, operated by West Japan Railway Company (JR West).

Lines

Station layout
Higashi-Obama Station has one side platform serving a single bi-directional track. The station is staffed and is located inside the Obama Municipal Sōgō Welfare Center building.

History
Higashi-Obama Station was opened on 14 August 1953. With the privatization of Japanese National Railways (JNR) on 1 April 1987, the station came under the control of JR West.

Passenger statistics
In fiscal 2016, the station was used by an average of 390 passengers daily (boarding passengers only).

Surrounding area
Fukui Prefecture Wakasa Governmental Office
Onyū Post Office
Wakasa Historical Folk Customs & Culture Center
Wakasa Rikuen
Fukui Prefecture Wakasa Heliport
Fukui Prefectural Wakasa East High School
Employment and Human Resources Development Organization of Japan (Polytech Center Obama)

 Wakasahiko Shrine

Others
The station is going to be passed through Hokuriku Shinkansen around 2046.

See also
 List of railway stations in Japan

References

External links

  

Railway stations in Japan opened in 1953
Stations of West Japan Railway Company
Railway stations in Fukui Prefecture
Obama Line
Obama, Fukui